Jeremy Rickard, also known as J. C. Rickard or J. Rickard, is a British mathematician who deals with algebra and algebraic topology. He researches modular representation theory of finite groups and related questions of algebraic topology, representation theory of finite algebras and homological algebra. Rickard or derived equivalences as a generalization of Morita equivalences of rings and algebras are named after him.

Education and career
Rickard received his PhD in 1988 from University College London under Aidan Schofield. He is a professor at the University of Bristol.

Recognition
Rickard was a winner of the Whitehead Prize in 1995.
In 2002, he received the Senior Berwick Prize. In 1998, he was an Invited Speaker with talk The abelian defect group conjecture at the International Congress of Mathematicians in Berlin.

Selected publications

References

External links 
 Homepage

20th-century  English mathematicians
Alumni of University College London
Academics of the University of Bristol
Living people
Year of birth missing (living people)